Anna Kaniuk (sometimes recorded as Hanna Kaniuk, born 16 August 1984) is a visually impaired Paralympian athlete from Belarus competing mainly in T12 classification sprint and long jump events. Kaniuk has represented her country at three Summer Paralympics winning two bronze medals, the first at the 2004 Athens Games and the second in London in 2012. Kaniuk has also won medals at IPC World and European Championships.

References

External links
 

1984 births
Belarusian female sprinters
Belarusian female long jumpers
Paralympic athletes of Belarus
Athletes (track and field) at the 2004 Summer Paralympics
Athletes (track and field) at the 2008 Summer Paralympics
Athletes (track and field) at the 2012 Summer Paralympics
Paralympic bronze medalists for Belarus
Living people
Medalists at the 2004 Summer Paralympics
Medalists at the 2012 Summer Paralympics
Medalists at the World Para Athletics Championships
Medalists at the World Para Athletics European Championships
Paralympic medalists in athletics (track and field)
Visually impaired sprinters
Visually impaired long jumpers
Paralympic sprinters
Paralympic long jumpers
Belarusian people with disabilities
Blind people